This is a list of notable buildings in Belgrade, Serbia.

Academic buildings

 Belgrade Law School
 Belgrade University Library
 Third Belgrade Gymnasium
 Zemun Gymnasium

Civil buildings
 Avala TV Tower – highest of its kind in the world; reconstructed following its destruction in the NATO bombing of 1999, and opened in 2010.
 Belgrade Fair - Hall 1 – the world's largest dome between 1957 and 1965
 Beograđanka – once the tallest business tower in the Balkans
 BIGZ building
 Dom Sindikata
 Eastern City Gate
 Gardoš Tower
 General Post Office, Belgrade
 PRIZAD building
 Sava Center – the biggest congress hall in the region.
 Sava City
 Serbian Journalists’ Association Building
 Ušće Tower – Formerly housed the Central Committee of the Communist Party of Yugoslavia. Following NATO bombing, from which only the skeleton of the building survived, it has been redeveloped into an office block.
 Veljković Family House
 Vučo’s House on the Sava River
 Yugoslav Ministry of Defence building
 Western City Gate – the third tallest residential building in the Balkans

Historical buildings
 1 Turgenjev Street, historic building, Communist Party Residence and meeting place
 Agrarian Bank Building
 Archives of Yugoslavia
 Area around Dositej’s Lyceum
 Beli Dvor – royal mansion with its neo-renaissance and neoclassic castles
 Belgrade Meteorological Station
 Belgrade Planetarium
 Belgrade Town Hall Building
 Captain Miša’s Mansion – home to the University of Belgrade
 Customs Office building, Zemun
 Despot Stefan Tower build in 1402.
 First Serbian Observatory
 First Town Hospital
 Hammam of Prince Miloš
 House of Vuk's Foundation
 House of the National Assembly of the Republic of Serbia
 Ilija M. Kolarac Endowment
 Jovan Cvijić's House
 Kuća Cveća – Josip Broz Tito mausoleum
 Mehmed Paša Sokolović's Fountain
 Military Hospital, Vračar
 Mika Alas's House, 1910-built historic home of scientist Mihailo Petrović
 Ministry of Finance of Serbia Building
 Ministry of Forestry and Mining and Ministry of Agriculture and Waterworks Building, Belgrade
 National Theatre
 National Bank Building, Belgrade
 Nebojša Tower
 Nikola Pašić's House
 Nikola Spasić Endowment Building in Belgrade
 Novi dvor
 Officers' Club (Belgrade)
 Palace Albania – built in 1930, the first Balkan skyscraper
 Prince Miloš's Residence – early 19th century Balkan-style residence
 Princess Ljubica's Residence – early 19th century Balkan-style residence
 Royal Compound, Belgrade
 Royal Palace (Belgrade)
 Ruski car Tavern
 Russian Center of Science and Culture, Belgrade
 Serbian Academy of Sciences and Arts – One of the most beautiful buildings in Belgrade, built in 1922
 Seismological Institute Building
 Spirta House, Belgrade
 The Old Palace – neoclassicism in Belgrade, early 20th century

Hotels
 Aleksandar Palas Hotel
 Crowne Plaza Belgrade
 Hotel Bristol, Belgrade
 Hotel Jugoslavija
 Hotel Moskva, Belgrade
 Hyatt Regency Belgrade
 Metropol Palace Hotel Belgrade
 Queen's Astoria Design Hotel
 Slavija Hotels

Museums
 National Museum
 Belgrade City Museum
 Museum of Contemporary Art
 Museum of Applied Arts
 Museum of African Ar

Religious buildings
 Bajrakli Mosque – one of the oldest mosques in the Balkans, early 16th century
 Belgrade Synagogue
 Building of the Patriarchate, Belgrade
 Church of the Ascension, Belgrade
 Saborna Crkva – neobaroque in Belgrade, mid 19th century
 Cathedral of Saint Sava – The world's largest Eastern Orthodox Christian (Serbian Orthodox) cathedral.
 St. Mark's Church – Emperor Dusan's tomb.
 Saint Sava House

Sports buildings
 Belgrade Arena – the biggest sports hall in Southeastern/Central Europe
 Ranko Žeravica Sports Hall
 Tašmajdan Sports and Recreation Center

See also
 Architecture of Belgrade
 Architecture in Serbia
 List of tallest structures in Serbia
 List of tallest buildings in Balkans

References

 
Architecture in Serbia
Buildings